The Jacobs R-915 or Jacobs L-6 is a seven-cylinder, air-cooled, radial engine for aircraft manufactured in the United States, production started in 1936.

Design and development
The R-915 was effectively an enlargement of the R-755 with strengthened stressed parts. The engine features steel cylinders with aluminum-alloy cylinder heads.

Variants
R-915A1Baseline  variant; an enlarged R-755
R-915A3Similar to the A1 but with Scintilla magnetoes
R-915A4With a power take-off for autogyros

Applications
 Avro Anson Mk II and Mk III
 Beechcraft Model 18D
 Beechcraft F-17D Staggerwing
 Fleet 50
 Howard DGA-15J
 Kellett KD-1
 Waco AQC, AGC, ARE, AVN

Engines on display
A preserved Jacobs R-915 is on display at the Nanton Lancaster Society.
A Jacobs L-6 is on display at the Canadian Museum of Flight

Specifications (R-915A1)

See also

References

Notes

Bibliography

Gunston, Bill. World Encyclopedia of Aero Engines. Cambridge, England. Patrick Stephens Limited, 1989. 
Jane's Fighting Aircraft of World War II. London. Studio Editions Ltd, 1989.

External links

Jacobs L-6 MB, Bomber Command Museum of Canada - Nanton Lancaster Society
FAA Type Data Certificate Sheet - R-915

1930s aircraft piston engines
Aircraft air-cooled radial piston engines
Jacobs aircraft engines